The High Park Demons (formerly known as the Missisauga Demons and Missisauga Mustangs) is an amateur Australian rules football club based in Toronto, Ontario, Canada.

History
The team began in 1989 as the Mississauga Mustangs, an inaugural member of the Canadian Australian Football Association.

On October 12, 1989, during half time of an exhibition match between the AFL teams Melbourne Demons and Geelong Football Club in Toronto, footy jumpers were presented to the team captain of the Mustangs.

Two days later the Mustangs were defeated by the Panthers 65 to 48, winning the inaugural Conacher Cup.

In 1999, the Brampton Wolverines disbanded due to a shortage of players, with the remaining players joining the Mississauga Mustangs.

In 2004, the team was renamed the Demons, and adopted the identity of the Melbourne Demons AFL club.

In 2007, the club relocated to High Park and changed their name.

OAFL Premierships
1994

External links

Australian rules football clubs in Toronto
Australian rules football clubs in Canada
Ontario Australian Football League clubs
1989 establishments in Ontario
Australian rules football clubs established in 1989